Sherburn may refer to:

Places
Sherburn, County Durham, England
Sherburn Hill, a separate village to the east of Sherburn 
Sherburn House, a hamlet to the south-west of Sherburn
Sherburn Hospital, a medieval hospital located at Sherburn House
Sherburn, North Yorkshire, England
Sherburn Rural District, East Riding of Yorkshire, England
Sherburn in Elmet, North Yorkshire, England
Sherburn, Minnesota, United States

People
Beth Sherburn (born 1991), English singer-songwriter
George Sherburn (1884–1962), American scholar 
Sherburn M. Becker (1876–1949), American politician
Sherburn Wightman (1882–1930), American football player and coach

See also
 
 Sherburn railway station (disambiguation)
 Sherburne (disambiguation)